High-mast lighting is a tall pole with lighting attached to the top pointing towards the ground, usually but not always used to light a highway or recreational field. It is used at sites that require lighting over a large area. Most units have four, six or eight lights in the ring, with three, five, ten, twelve and sixteen lights used in rarer instances. While most high-mast lights are high-pressure sodium, other types such as mercury vapor, metal halide and LED, have also been used. Some units have the lighting surrounded by a circular shield to prevent or reduce light pollution or light trespass from affecting neighborhoods adjacent to the highway.

Maintenance of these systems is done by lowering the luminaire ring from the mast head to the base using a winch and motor to the ground or at a height accessible by a cherry picker and located in areas to allow for easier access without disrupting traffic.

Development history 
Prior to the 1960s, highway lighting was often provided by shorter (approx. ) lighting poles with mercury vapor lamps. Advancements in high-mast illumination took place extensively in the mid-1960s in both Europe and North America. By 1967, Europe was known to have high-mast illumination technology in practice. 1968 saw the first permanent US installations of high-mast illumination starting in Auburn, Washington south of Seattle. A later project in 1968 featured a  fixed-lighting tower on the Texas-Arkansas state line with two other  fixed-lighting towers on either side of the state-border. By 1969/70, winch systems for the lighting systems were developed and several  towers were installed in Dallas and Houston, followed soon thereafter by  towers. Houston is believed to be the world's leading city of high-mast illumination along its freeways. Despite this, Belgium is considered to have the world's best-lit freeways.

Moonlight towers in Austin, Texas served as a major influence on TxDOT's design of some of the first modern high-mast lighting towers in the US during the 1960s and 1970s.

References

See also 

 Moonlight tower
 Light tower (equipment)
 Flood light

Road transport
Lighting